The Apostolic Vicariate of Meki is a Latin Catholic apostolic vicariate located in Meki, Ethiopia.

History
 March 6, 1980: Established as Apostolic Prefecture of Meki from the Apostolic Vicariate of Harar
 December 21, 1991: Promoted as Apostolic Vicariate of Meki

Bishops

Ordinaries
 Prefect Apostolic of Meki (Roman Rite) 
 Fr. Yohannes Woldegiorgis (later Bishop) (September 8, 1981 – December 21, 1991); see below
 Vicar Apostolics of Meki (Roman rite)
 Bishop Yohannes Woldegiorgis (December 21, 1991 – September 19, 2002); see above
 Bishop Abraham Desta (January 29, 2003 – present)

Other priest of this vicariate who became bishop
Noel Seyoum Fransua, appointed Vicar Apostolic of Hosanna in 2017

See also 
 Meki Catholic School (MCS)

References

External links
 GCatholic.org
 Catholic Hierarchy 

Catholic dioceses in Ethiopia
Christian organizations established in 1980
Apostolic vicariates
Roman Catholic dioceses and prelatures established in the 20th century
Oromia Region